The 1902 Major League Baseball season was contested from April 17 through October 5, 1902 with each team schedule to play the other seven teams in their league 20 times for a 140-game season. It was the second season for the American League (AL), with the Philadelphia Athletics finishing first in league standings. In the National League (NL), in operation since 1876, the Pittsburgh Pirates finished atop league standings for the second consecutive season. There was no postseason.

Prior to the season, the Milwaukee Brewers moved and became the St. Louis Browns; the franchise would remain in St. Louis through 1953, and in 1954 moved again to become the Baltimore Orioles.

Standings

American League

National League

Managers

American League

National League

League leaders

Batting

Pitching

League leaders

External links
1902 in baseball history from ThisGreatGame.com
1902 Major League Baseball season schedule at Baseball Reference

 
Major League Baseball seasons